Ricnodon is an extinct genus of microsaur within the family Hapsidopareiontidae.
The genus name means ‘wrinkled tooth’ from Ancient Greek ῥικνός and odôn. The specific name honors Edward Drinker Cope.

See also

 Prehistoric amphibian
 List of prehistoric amphibians

References

Microsauria
Paleozoic life of Nova Scotia